Little Creek Hundred Rural Historic District is a national historic district located near Little Creek, Kent County, Delaware. It encompasses 21 contributing buildings, 1 contributing site, and 1 contributing structure in a rural area near Little Creek. It consists of 11 distinct adjoining farm complexes, an
octagonal school house and the Little Creek Quaker Meeting house and cemetery.  Eight of the major buildings are built of brick, three are frame, and two are stone.

It was listed on the National Register of Historic Places in 1984.

References

Historic districts in Kent County, Delaware
Octagonal school buildings in the United States
Historic districts on the National Register of Historic Places in Delaware
National Register of Historic Places in Kent County, Delaware